Vasilije is a South Slavic masculine given name, a variant of Greek given name Vassilios ("Basil"). It may refer to:

Vasilije, Serbian Patriarch, Serbian cleric born Vasilije Jovanović-Brkić
Vasilije Calasan (born 1981), French racing driver
Vasa Čarapić (1768–1806), Serbian voivode (military commander)
Vasa Jovanović (1874–1970), Serbian lawyer, politician, founder of the Chetnik movement and a founding member of the League of Nations
Vasilije Krestić (born 1932), intellectual and historian, and a member of the Serbian Academy of Sciences and Arts
Vasilije Matić (1906–1981), forestry expert born in Srpske Moravice
Vasilije Mokranjac (1923–1984), greatly influential and renowned Serbian composer
Vasa Pelagić (1833–1899), Bosnian Serb writer, physician, educator, clergyman, nationalist and proponent of utopian socialism
Vasilije Petrović (1709–1766), Prince Bishop of Montenegro
Vasilije Popović (disambiguation), multiple people
Vasilije Prodanović (born 1985), Serbian footballer
Vasilije Radović (born 1938), former Yugoslav football goalkeeper and manager
Vasilije Šijaković (1929–2003), Montenegrin football player
Vasilije Tomović (born 1906), Montenegrin chess master
Vasilije Trbić (1881–1962), Serbian Chetnik leader and politician
Vasa Živković (1819–1891), Serbian poet and Orthodox priest

See also
Monastery Saint Vasilije Ostroški, Serbian Orthodox monastery in the center of Bijeljina, Republika Srpska, Bosnia and Herzegovina

Serbian masculine given names
Montenegrin masculine given names